Claude de Beauharnais (Rochefort, 16 January 1717 – Paris, 25 December 1784) was a French nobleman. He was the second son of Claude de Beauharnais (1680–1738).

Marriage and issue
On 6 March 1753, he married Marie-Anne-Françoise Mouchard and their children were: 
 Claude de Beauharnais (1756–1819), 2nd Count des Roches-Baritaud (1756–1819).
 Françoise de Beauharnais (1757–1822) 
 Anne de Beauharnais (1760–1831)

1717 births
1784 deaths
Claude de Beauharnais (1717-1784)